Homeobox protein Hox-B4 is a protein that in humans is encoded by the HOXB4 gene.

Function 

This gene is a member of the Antp homeobox family and encodes a nuclear protein with a homeobox DNA-binding domain. It is included in a cluster of homeobox B genes located on chromosome 17. The encoded protein functions as a sequence-specific transcription factor that is involved in development. Intracellular or ectopic expression of this protein expands hematopoietic stem and progenitor cells in vivo and in vitro, making it a potential candidate for therapeutic stem cell expansion.

See also 
 Homeobox

References

Further reading

External links 
 

Transcription factors